La Française may refer to:
 La Française (cycling team), a French professional cycling team that existed from 1901 to 1955
 La Française Group, a French asset manager created in 1975